HMAS Betano (L 133) was a  heavy landing craft operated by the Royal Australian Navy (RAN).

Design and construction

The eight-vessel Balikpapan class was ordered as a locally manufactured replacement for the Australian Army's LSM-1-class landing ship medium and ALC 50 landing craft. The landing craft have a standard displacement of 316 tons, with a full load displacement of 503 tons. They are propelled by two G.M. Detroit 6-71 diesel motors, providing 675 brake horsepower to the two propeller shafts, allowing the vessels to reach . The standard ship's company is 13-strong. The Balikpapans are equipped with a Decca RM 916 navigational radar, and fitted with two  machine guns for self-defence.

The LCHs have a maximum payload of 180 tons; equivalent to 3 Leopard 1 tanks, 13 M113 armoured personnel carriers, 23 quarter-tonne trucks, or four LARC-V amphibious cargo vehicles. As a troop transport, a Balikpapan-class vessel can transport up to 400 soldiers between a larger amphibious ship and the shore, or embark 60 soldiers in six-berth caravans for longer voyages. The flat, box-like keel causes the ships to roll considerably in other-than-calm conditions, limiting their ability to make long voyages.

Betano was laid down by Walkers Limited at Maryborough, Queensland on 3 October 1972, launched on 12 December 1972, and commissioned into the RAN on 8 February 1974.

Operational history
In April 1974, Betano, Buna, and Brunei transited to Lord Howe Island as a demonstration of the Balikpanan class' oceangoing capabilities.

Following the destruction of Darwin by Cyclone Tracy during the night of 24–25 December 1974, Betano was deployed as part of the relief effort; Operation Navy Help Darwin. Betano sailed from Brisbane on 26 December.

From 1985 to 1988, Betano and Brunei were assigned to the Australian Hydrographic Officer and operated as survey ships in the waters of northern Australia and Papua New Guinea.

The ship was deployed to East Timor as part of the Australian-led INTERFET peacekeeping taskforce from 19 January to 19 February 2000. Her service earned her the battle honour "East Timor 2000".

Decommissioning and fate
Betano was decommissioned at Darwin on 12 December 2012. It was later confirmed that the Philippine Navy will acquire three more LCHs from Australia, including ex-HMAS Betano, at a token price.

References

Sources
Books

Journal articles

Balikpapan-class landing craft heavy
1972 ships